Wayne Dale Gross (born January 14, 1952), is an American former professional baseball player who played in Major League Baseball (MLB) primarily as a third baseman from 1976-1986.  Gross was named to the All-Star Game as a rookie in 1977 as a last-minute injury replacement for Vida Blue. As a rookie Gross belted 22 home runs on the year. On December 8, 1983, Gross was traded by the Oakland Athletics to the Baltimore Orioles for Tim Stoddard.

Along with former big leaguer Carney Lansford, Gross makes a cameo in the 1994 Disney movie, Angels in the Outfield as a relief pitcher for the Chicago White Sox.

Gross coached high school baseball and tennis for a time at Monte Vista High School in Danville, California.

References

External links

1952 births
Living people
American expatriate baseball players in Canada
American League All-Stars
Baltimore Orioles players
Baseball players from California
Birmingham A's players
Burlington Bees players
Cal Poly Pomona Broncos baseball players
Lewiston Broncs players
Major League Baseball third basemen
Oakland Athletics players
Tacoma Tigers players
Tucson Toros players
Vancouver Canadians players
Riverside Polytechnic High School alumni